= Louis Perry =

Eighth president of Whitman College

Louis Barnes Perry (March 4, 1918 – September 28, 2013) was an American academic who was the eighth president of Whitman College in Walla Walla, Washington.

== Biography ==
Perry was born in 1918. He attended UCLA. He taught at Pomona College from 1950 to 1959. He then became president of Whitman College, a role he held until 1967.
